The following is a list of football stadiums in Switzerland, ordered by capacity. Capacity is maximum capacity, not just seating capacity. Currently all stadiums with a capacity of 4,000 or more are included. Those in bold are part of the 2022–23 Swiss Super League season.

Projects
Stadion Zürich, Zürich (Grasshopper Club Zürich, FC Zürich)

Notes

See also

Stades.ch: the website of all stadiums of Switzerland
List of European stadiums by capacity
List of association football stadiums by capacity

 
Switzerland
Football stadiums
Football stadiums